"Destinazione paradiso" is a song written and recorded by Italian singer-songwriter Gianluca Grignani together with Massimo Luca, who produced the track for Grignani's debut album with the same title.

The song was first performed by Grignani during the Sanremo Music Festival in 1995, when he competed in the newcomers' section, finishing in sixth place. It later became Grignani's first big success, launching his career in Italy. The song was also recorded by Grignani in a Spanish-language version, titled "Destino paraíso" and included in the Hispanic edition of his album, released with the same title in 1995. This version of the song peaked at number 16 on the Billboard Latin Pop Airplay chart.

In 2006, Italian singer Laura Pausini recorded a cover of both versions of the song, including "Destinazione paradiso" on Io canto and "Destino paraíso" on the Spanish-language version of the album, Yo canto. After being performed during her 2007's concert at the San Siro stadium in Milan, the live performance of the song was released as a single promoting the video album San Siro 2007.

Background and composition
The song was composed by Grignani with Italian songwriter and record producer Massimo Luca. During an interview released in 1995, Grignani revealed that he wrote the lyrics of the song in a moment of deep suffering, while he was one step from suicide: "It was more than one year ago [in 1994], my lack of self-confidence exploded in a single moment. That days, my parents were divorcing". Grignani also explained that he didn't intend to extend the message of his song to his whole generation: "I just wanted to express my personal way of being or not being".

The song was performed for the first time on 23 February 1995, during the third night of the 45th Sanremo Music Festival, as Grignani's entry for the newcomers' competition. Grignani was scheduled to perform as the second artist on the night but, for the first time in the contest's history, the order was changed at the last moment, therefore Grignani opened the competition, replacing Danilo Amerio who was late because of a traffic jam.
During the night, it received 6,541 placing first on his semi-final and being admitted to the newcomers' final, held on the following day. After performing the song for a second time, Grignani received 9,434 votes, placing sixth in the newcomers' section.

In 2016, Grignani re-recorded the song as a duet with Italian singer Elisa, included in his compilation album Una strada in mezzo al cielo.

Track listing
CD single – "Destinazione paradiso"
 "Destinazione paradiso" – 3:45
 "Il gioco di Sandy" 3:35

Charts

Certifications

Laura Pausini version

Italian singer Laura Pausini recorded the song in 2006 for her album Io canto, entirely composed of covers of songs by Italian male singer-songwriters. The Spanish-language version of the song, "Destino paraíso", was also recorded and included in the Hispanic version of the album, Yo canto, released in Spain, South America and in the United States.

Pausini performed the song live during her 2007 only concert, held at the San Siro stadium in Milan. This performance was included in the live and video album San Siro 2007, released on 30 November 2007, and it was chosen as a single from the album, together with "Y mi banda toca el rock".

Commercial performance
Immediately after its release, the song entered the Italian Top Digital Download, compiled by the Federation of the Italian Music Industry, debuting and peaking at number eight. However, until January 2008, FIMI considered the physical singles chart as the official one in Italy, and "Destinazione paradiso" was released as a digital download only. In January 2008, when the Top Digital Download became the primary singles chart in Italy, the song spent three additional weeks on the chart's top 20, reaching number 14 in the week of 10 January 2008.
According to Musica e Dischi, Pausini's version of "Destinazione paradiso" sold 15,000 digital copies in Italy in 2008.

Personnel

Live version
Music credits
 Paolo Carta – guitar
 Cesare Chiodo – bass
 Gabriele Fersini – guitar
 Alfredo Golino – drums
 Roberta Granà – backing vocals
 Massimo Guarini – backing vocals
 Adriano Martino – guitar
 Laura Pausini – vocals
 Bruno Zucchetti – piano, keyboards
 Barbara Zappamiglio – backing vocals

Production credits
 Maurizio Maggi – engineer
 Francesco Luzzi – mixing
 Nicola Fantozzi – assistant

Studio version

Music credits
 John Beasley – piano, keyboards
 Paul Bushnell – bass
 Vinnie Colaiuta – drums
 Samuele Dessì – guitar
 Giancarlo Di Maria – string arrangement
 Bruce Dukow – concert master
 Suzie Katayama – string contractor
 Michael Landau – guitar
 Raphael Padilla – percussions
 Laura Pausini – vocals
 Celso Valli – string arrangement, string director
 Daniel Vuletic – programming, guitar, piano, keyboards, backing vocals, arrangement, string arrangement

Production credits
 Marco Borsatti – engineer
 Samuele Dessì – pre-producer
 Nicola Fantozzi – assistant
 Matt Serrecchio – assistant
 Francesco Luzzi – mixing
 Laura Pausini – producer
 Luca Pellegrini – assistant
 Saverio Principi – engineer
 Tom Syrowsky – assistant
 Michael Tacci – engineer
 Daniel Vuletic – pre-producer, producer

Track listing
Digital download
 "Destinazione paradiso" – 3:50
 "Y mi banda toca el rock" – 3:58

Charts

References

1995 singles
2007 singles
Laura Pausini songs
Italian-language songs
Spanish-language songs
Sanremo Music Festival songs
1995 songs
Atlantic Records singles
Mercury Records singles
PolyGram singles